

Events 
 Giovanni Pierluigi da Palestrina becomes maestro di cappella at the Julian Chapel, St. Peter's, Rome
 Andrea Gabrieli writes the music for the festivities celebrating the victory of the Venetians over the Turks after the Battle of Lepanto.
 Orlande de Lassus visits France at the personal invitation of King Charles IX, who unsuccessfully attempts to employ him
 Tomás Luis de Victoria begins teaching at the Collegio Germanico in Rome
 Bálint Bakfark, Hungarian lutenist, moves to Padua, Italy

Bands disbanded
Weimar Court Chapel Choir

Publications 
 Elias Ammerbach –  (Leipzig: Jacob Berwald Erben), the first printed German organ music in tablature 
 Costanzo Antegnati – First book of madrigals for four voices with a dialogue for eight (Venice: Antonio Gardano)
 Giammateo Asola – , for three voices, book 1 (Venice: Antonio Gardano and sons), a book of madrigals
 Fabrice Caietain
 for four voices (Paris: Le Roy & Ballard), a collection of motets
 for six voices (Paris: Le Roy & Ballard)
 Francesco Corteccia
First book of motets for six voices (Venice: the sons of Antonio Gardano)
First book of motets for five voices (Venice: the sons of Antonio Gardano)
 Giovanni Matteo Faà di Bruno – Second book of madrigals for five and six voices (Venice: the sons of Antonio Gardano)
 Jacobus de Kerle –  for five and six voices (Nuremberg: Theodor Gerlach)
 Orlande de Lassus
 (Motets for five voices, never before published) (Paris: Le Roy & Ballard)
 for four voices (Paris: Le Roy & Ballard)
 Luzzasco Luzzaschi – First book of madrigals for five voices (Ferrara: Francesco de' Rossi)
 Tiburtio Massaino – First book of madrigals for five voices (Venice: Antonio Gardano)
 Philippe de Monte – Fourth book of madrigals for five voices (Venice: Girolamo Scotto)
 Alexander Utendal – 
 Gioseffo Zarlino – , which establishes the primacy of the major mode

Births 
January 15 (baptized) – Henry Ainsworth, author of the Ainsworth Psalter, the only book of music brought by the Pilgrim settlers to the Massachusetts Bay Colony in 1620. (died 1622)
February 15 (possibly) – Michael Praetorius, German organist, composer and music theorist (died 1621)
May 17 – William White, English composer
August 7 – Thomas Lupo, English composer of instrumental music (died 1627)
December 27 – Johannes Kepler, astronomer and writer on music (died 1630)
 Dates unknown
 Filipe de Magalhães, Portuguese composer
 Leon Modena, Italian rabbi, cantor, scholar and writer on music
 Martin Peerson (born ca. 1571 – ca. 1573; died 1650 or 1651), English composer, organist and virginalist
 John Ward, English composer of madrigals

Deaths 
February 13 – Benvenuto Cellini, cornettist and recorder player, best known as a goldsmith and sculptor (born November 1, 1500)
March 20 – Giovanni Animuccia, composer (born c.1520)
June 7 – Francesco Corteccia, Italian composer and organist (born 1502)
November 21 – Jan Blahoslav, Czech writer and composer (born 1523)
date unknown
Francisco de Ceballos, organist and composer
Bernardino de Ribera (Sahagún), Spanish composer (born c.1499)

References

 
Music
16th century in music
Music by year